Sar Margh-e Sofla (also Romanized as Sar Margh-e Soflá) is a village in Robat Rural District, in the Central District of Khorramabad County, Lorestan Province, Iran. At the 2006 census, its population was 34, in 6 families.

References 

Towns and villages in Khorramabad County